Koteshwar may refer to:

 Koteshwar, Kutch, a Shiva temple in Gujarat, India
 Koteshwar, Karnataka, a village in Karnataka, India
 Koteshwor, Kathmandu, Nepal
 Koteshwar, Uttarakhand, a village in Uttarakhand, India
 Koteshwar Dam, part of the Tehri Dam complex in India
 Koteshwar Mahadev, a Shiva temple in Uttarakhand, India